The domestic duck or domestic mallard (Anas platyrhynchos domesticus) is a subspecies of mallard that has been domesticated by humans and raised for meat, eggs, and down feathers. A few are also kept for show, as pets, or for their ornamental value. Almost all varieties of domesticated ducks, apart from the domestic Muscovy duck (Cairina moschata), are descended from the mallard.

Domestication 

Whole-genome sequencing indicate that domestic ducks originate from a single domestication event of mallards during the Neolithic, followed by rapid selection for lineages favoring meat or egg production. They were likely domesticated in Southeast Asia (most likely Southern China) by the rice paddy-farming ancestors of modern Southeast Asians. The date of domestication is unknown due to the scarcity of archaeological records. They spread outwards from the region, first being mentioned in Han Chinese written records in central China by around 500 BC. Duck farming for both meat and eggs is a widespread and ancient industry in Southeast Asia.

Wild ducks were hunted extensively in Ancient Egypt and other parts of the world in ancient times. But they were not domesticated. Ducks are also mentioned to be present in Ancient Rome since at least the 2nd century BC. But based on descriptions (most notably by Columella), ducks in Roman agriculture were only tamed, not domesticated. Duck breeding did not exist in the Roman period, requiring the harvesting of eggs from wild ducks to start duck farms.

Almost all varieties of domestic duck except the muscovy have been derived from the mallard. Domestication has greatly altered their characteristics. Domestic ducks are mostly promiscuous, where wild mallards are monogamous. Domestic ducks have lost the mallard's territorial behaviour, and are less aggressive than mallards. Despite these differences, domestic ducks frequently mate with wild mallards, producing fully fertile hybrid offspring.

Farming 

Ducks have been farmed for thousands of years. Approximately 3 billion ducks are slaughtered each year for meat worldwide. In the Western world, they are not as popular as the chicken, because chickens have much more white lean meat and are easier to keep confined, making the total price much lower for chicken meat, whereas duck is comparatively expensive. While popular in haute cuisine, duck appears less frequently in the mass-market food industry and restaurants in the lower price range. However, ducks are more popular in China, and there they are raised extensively.

Ducks are farmed for their meat, eggs, and down. A minority of ducks are also kept for foie gras production. The blood of ducks slaughtered for meat is also collected in some regions and is used as an ingredient in many cultures' dishes. Their eggs are blue-green to white, depending on the breed.

Ducks can be kept free range, in cages, in barns, or in batteries. Ducks enjoy access to swimming water, but do not require it to survive. They should be fed a grain and insect diet. It is a popular misconception that ducks should be fed bread; bread has limited nutritional value and can be deadly when fed to developing ducklings. Ducks should be monitored for avian influenza, as they are especially prone to infection with the dangerous H5N1 strain.

The females of many breeds of domestic ducks are unreliable at sitting their eggs and raising their young. Exceptions include the Rouen duck and especially the Muscovy duck. It has been a custom on farms for centuries to put duck eggs under broody hens for hatching; nowadays this role is often played by an incubator. However, young ducklings rely on their mothers for a supply of preen oil to make them waterproof; a chicken hen does not make as much preen oil as a female duck, and an incubator makes none. Once the duckling grows its own feathers, it produces preen oil from the sebaceous gland near the base of its tail.

Ducks are also kept for their ornamental value. Breeds have been developed with crests and tufts or striking plumage, for exhibition in competitions.

In culture

In children's stories 

The domestic duck has appeared numerous times in children's stories. Beatrix Potter's The Tale of Jemima Puddle-Duck was published by Frederick Warne & Co in 1908. One of Potter's best-known books, the tale was included in the Royal Ballet's The Tales of Beatrix Potter. It is the story of how Jemima, a domestic duck, is saved from a cunning fox who plans to kill her, when she tries to find a safe place for her eggs to hatch.

Make Way for Ducklings is a children's picture book written and illustrated by Robert McCloskey. First published in 1941, the book tells the story of a pair of mallards who decide to raise their family on an island in the lagoon in Boston Public Garden, a park in the center of Boston. Make Way for Ducklings won the 1942 Caldecott Medal for McCloskey's illustrations.

The Disney cartoon character Donald Duck, one of the world's most recognizable pop culture icons, is a domestic duck of the American Pekin breed.

In music 
The domestic duck features in the musical composition Peter and the Wolf, written by Sergei Prokofiev in 1936. The orchestra illustrates the children's story while the narrator tells it. In this, a domestic duck and a little bird argue on each other's flight capabilities. The duck is represented by the oboe. The story ends with the wolf eating the duck alive, its quack heard from inside the wolf's belly.

In art 
Domestic ducks are frequently depicted in wall paintings and grave objects from ancient Egypt. They are featured in a range of ancient artefacts, which revealed that they were a fertility symbol.

As food 

Since ancient times, the duck has been eaten as food. Usually only the breast and thigh meat is eaten. It does not need to be hung before preparation, and is often braised or roasted, sometimes flavoured with bitter orange or with port. Peking duck is a dish of roast duck from Beijing, China, that has been prepared since medieval times. It is today traditionally served with spring pancakes, spring onions and sweet bean sauce.

See also

 Domestic Muscovy duck

References

External links

 Duck and Goose from Farm to Table factsheet from USDA

Domesticated birds
Ducks
Poultry
Birds described in 1758
Taxa named by Carl Linnaeus